Marie Josèphe Fegue (born 28 May 1991) is a Cameroonian weightlifter. She competed in the women's 69 kg event at the 2014 Commonwealth Games where she won a gold medal. She competed at world championships, most recently at the 2010 World Weightlifting Championships.

Major results

References

External links

1991 births
Living people
Sportspeople from Yaoundé
Commonwealth Games gold medallists for Cameroon
Commonwealth Games bronze medallists for Cameroon
Weightlifters at the 2010 Commonwealth Games
Weightlifters at the 2014 Commonwealth Games
Cameroonian female weightlifters
Commonwealth Games medallists in weightlifting
21st-century Cameroonian women
Medallists at the 2014 Commonwealth Games